Merle Greene Robertson (August 30, 1913 – April 22, 2011) was an American artist, art historian, archaeologist, lecturer and Mayanist researcher, renowned for her extensive work towards the investigation and preservation of the art, iconography, and writing of the pre-Columbian Maya civilization of Central America. She is most famous for her rubbings of Maya carved stelae, sculpture, and carved stone, particularly at the Maya sites of Tikal and Palenque.

Early life and education
Robertson was born in 1913 in the small town of Miles City, Montana to Ada Emma Foote and Darrell Irving McCann, but she moved to Great Falls, Montana as a small child. Here she became greatly interested in Native American culture and even learned Indian sign language from Blackfoot Indian chiefs her father was close friends with. But more importantly, in Great Falls she met the artist Charles M. Russell who spent many afternoons teaching Merle how to paint. She moved to Seattle, Washington, as a teenager and completed high school there and attended the University of Washington.

Adulthood 
Merle started working as a commercial artist and gold leaf window painter; during the summers she worked at Camp Tapawingo. Following her graduation, Merle married her college boyfriend Wallace McNeill Greene. The couple was married for thirteen years and had two children, David and Barbara. However, the marriage dissolved when Merle found out her husband had participated in multiple affairs throughout the years. After the divorce, Merle and her children moved to California, where she began teaching at San Rafael Military Academy. There is where she first met Bob Robertson, the dean, who she would marry later on. She and Mr. Robertson traveled to El Salvador to visit cadets Quinonez, Escalon and Sagrera and learn about salvadorean  archeology. She later decided to go back to school and moved to San Miguel de Allende, Mexico.

She earned her Master's of Fine Arts from the University of Guanajuato, where she studied watercolors, oils, photography, and mural painting from one of Mexico's top artists, James Pinto. After completing her MFA, Merle began working on the Tikal Project with the University of Pennsylvania in 1961. She spent three summers drawing the architecture of the Central Acropolis. She also started her famous rubbings at this time, making the art form a way to document and preserve the information on Maya relief sculptures. While she was there, it was suggested that she travel through Guatemala and record stelae at other sites.

While Merle carved out a path for herself as a Mayanist she continued to teach school in the states. She and her husband Bob both worked at the Stevenson School in Pebble Beach, California; this is where Merle first began to instill her love of the Maya into young students. She taught a Mesoamerican Archaeology class and she took many of her students on expeditions into the jungles of Central America. Some of her students even went on to study archaeology at college and pursue a career studying the Maya, one of the best examples being Mayanist Arlen F. Chase.

Contribution to Maya Studies

Rubbings 

Initially trained as an artist, Robertson pioneered the technique of taking rubbings from Maya monumental sculptures and inscriptions, making over 4,000 of these over a career spanning four decades (2,000 being monuments). In many cases these rubbings have preserved features of the artworks which have since deteriorated or even disappeared, through the actions of the environment or looters. This method was first used by the ancient Chinese but Merle further developed and refined the process. She developed two techniques using two different forms of ink on rice paper. The type of ink that was chosen was based on the environmental conditions and the nature of the item being recorded. Merle, along with Mayanist Tatiana Proskouriakoff and Edith Ricketson, paved the way for women to enter the field of Maya archaeology. She was the first woman to join the Tikal Project, at a time where it was generally understood that women were not to work on archaeological projects.

Merle is most well known for her work at Palenque. In the 1980s, she undertook a project to document and record in detail all the sculptural art. This led to the instrumentation of the series of Mayanist conferences known as the Palenque Round Tables, which have produced some of the most significant breakthroughs in Maya research and the epigraphic decipherment of the ancient Maya script. The meetings started in December 1973 and ended in June of 1993. A total of 10 of the proceedings of the round table meetings have been published as volumes.

Merle also famously worked at Chichen Itza for many years. Here she also created a large, encompassing report of all the sculptures at the site. Not only did she record the hieroglyphic and iconographic inscriptions, she also interpreted the work through the eyes of the authors. This showed her unique perspective as an artist rather than a formally trained archaeologist.

In 1982, Merle founded the Pre-Columbian Art Institute, which publishes the PARI Journal. This non-profit organization supported the research of Mesoamerican art, epigraphy, and iconography and funded archaeological excavations at Palenque under the Cross Group Project.

In 2004, Robertson received the Orden del Pop Award from Guatemala's Museo Popol Vuh in recognition of her decades of work preserving the country's Maya cultural heritage through her detailed documentation of Maya monuments and hieroglyphic writing. This Instituto de Nacional de Anthropologia e Historia (INAH) also presented Merle with the Order of the Aztec Eagle and named her Honorary President of the Palenque Round Tables which have since continued.

Notes

References

External links
 Pre-Columbian Art Research Institute (PARI), founded by Robertson
 Merle Greene Robertson's Rubbings of Maya Sculpture, at Mesoweb. Contains online database of selected reproductions and some history.
 Merle Greene Robertson receives the Orden del Pop, video of award ceremony, Museo Popol Vuh (WMV format)

Mayanists
American Mesoamericanists
Women Mesoamericanists
Mesoamerican epigraphers
American women artists
20th-century Mesoamericanists
People from Great Falls, Montana
1913 births
2011 deaths
People from Miles City, Montana
American women archaeologists
21st-century American women